Ellen Fraatz, known professionally as Ellen Allien, is a German electronic musician, music producer, and the founder of BPitch Control music label. Her album Stadtkind was dedicated to the city of Berlin, and she cites the culture of reunified Berlin as one of the main inspirations for her music. She sings in both German and English. Her music is best described as a blend of IDM and Techno music, which is dance-floor oriented and has noticeable experimental elements.  She lives in Berlin and calls it the "best city in the world."

Career 
Ellen Allien was born and grew up in West Berlin. During 1989, she lived in London where she first came into contact with electronic music. When she later returned to Berlin, electronic music had become increasingly popular in Germany. In 1992, she became resident DJ at the Bunker, Tresor, and E-Werk. She started her own show on the Berlin radio station Kiss FM and created her own record label, calling them both "Braincandy". Due to problems with distribution, she gave the Braincandy label up in 1997 and instead began organizing parties with the name, "Pitch Control". 

She released her first album, Stadtkind, in 2001, and her second album, Berlinette, in 2003. In 2005, she released the album Thrills, followed by  Orchestra of Bubbles, a collaboration with Apparat, in 2006. During the same year, Allien launched her own fashion line, "Ellen Allien Fashion".

After the minimalistic Sool in 2008, she released her fifth solo album, Dust, in 2010.

Allien made a brief appearance in the 2009 electronic music documentary Speaking In Code. Then she worked on the music for the dance performance "Drama Per Musica", which has been premiered in Paris in March 2011 under the direction of Alexandre Roccoli and Sevérine Rième. The accompanying album "LISm" was released in 2013 and, like her DJ sets, unites different musical styles into a homogenous whole.

Also the successor "Nost" sets on variety, however within the electronic spectrum. Thus she returns to her technoid underground roots and stays true to her dancefloor principles after about three decades.

In 2019 Ellen Allien launched her UFO Inc. label with an EP that features the epic »UFO« which has been on heavy rotation in her DJ sets all summer long. Between »UFO« and the hard-hitting Berlin acid belter »Körpermaschine« on the flipside, the »UFO« EP perfectly captures the energetic hardware sound of Allien’s new imprint, which will be dedicated to a rough and raw approach to techno.

Ellen Allien holds residencies in the clubs Nitsa, Barcelona and Circoloco at DC10, Ibiza and is a regular in clubs such as Madrid’s Mondo. She started her already infamous bi-monthly 'We Are Not Alone' raves at Griessmühle in her beloved and vibrant native town Berlin that will guest in other cities around the globe too – just as her in-store record shop happenings under the name Vinylism. You will find her frequently performing festivals i. e. Germany’s MELT, N.A.M.E. Festival in France.

Record labels 
Allien created the techno label BPitch Control in 1999. Earlier in her career, around the time she hosted 'Braincandy' on Berlin's Kiss-FM, she launched her first record label name using the same name, this paved the way for the BPitch Control imprint. The label has launched the careers of popular artists, such as Modeselektor, Paul Kalkbrenner and Apparat. In 2005 Allien created a BPitch sublabel called "Memo Musik" for minimal tech and minimal house.

Discography

Albums 
 2001 – Stadtkind (BPC021)
 2003 – Berlinette (BPC065)
 2004 – Remix Collection (BPC080)
 2005 – Thrills (BPC106)
 2006 – Orchestra of Bubbles (BPC125)
 2008 – Sool (BPC175)
 2010 – Dust (BPC217)
 2013 – LISm (BPC264)
 2017 – Nost (BPC330)
 2019 – Alientronic (BPX001)
2020 – AurAA (BPX009)

EPs / singles 
 1995 – "Ellen Allien E.P."
 1995 – "Ellen Allien Vol. II [Yellow Sky]" (MFS7074-0)
 1997 – "Be Wild" (BRAINCANDY002)
 1997 – "Rockt Krieger" (BRAINCANDY003)
 2000 – "Last Kiss '99" (BPC008)
 2000 – "Dataromance" (BPC013)
 2001 – "Dataromance" (Remixes) (BPC029)
 2001 – "Stadtkind" (Remixes) (BPC030)
 2002 – "Erdbeermund" (BPC041)
 2003 – "Trash Scapes" (Remixes) (BPC066)
 2003 – "Alles Sehen" (Remixes) (BPC073)
 2004 – "Astral" (BPC085)
 2005 – "Magma" (BPC105)
 2005 – "Your Body Is My Body" (BPC113)
 2006 – "Just A Man/Just A Woman" (with Audion) (SPC36)
 2006 – "Down" (Remixes) (BPC116)
 2006 – "Turbo Dreams" (BPC124)
 2006 – "Way Out" (Remixes) (BPC129)
 2006 – "Jet" (Remixes) (BPC135)
 2007 – "Go" (BPC160)
 2008 – "Sprung / Its" (BPC176)
 2008 – "Out Remixes" (BPC178)
 2008 – "Elphine Remixes" (BPC181)
 2008 – "Ondu / Caress" (BPC186)
 2009 – "Lover" (BPC199)
 2010 – "Pump" (BPC209)
 2010 – "Flashy Flashy" (BPC216)
 2011 – "Dust (remixes)" EP 
 2014 – "Freak" EP 
 2015 – "Allien RMXS" (BPC313)
 2015 – "High" (BPC315)
 2016 – "Turn Off Your Mind" (BPC324)
 2016 – "Landing XX" (BPC328)
 2018 – "Take A Stand" (NONPLUS064)
 2019 – "Ufo" (UFO INC001)
 2019 – "La Música Es Dios" (UFO INC003)
 2020 - "Auraa"
 2021 - "Rosen EP"

Mix CDs 
 2001 – Flieg mit Ellen Allien ("Fly with Ellen Allien")
 2002 – Weiss.Mix ("White mix")
 2004 – My Parade
 2007 – Fabric 34: Ellen Allien
 2007 – Time Out Presents – The Other Side: Berlin
 2007 – Bpitch Control Camping Compilation 03
 2008 – Boogybytes, vol. 04
 2010 – Watergate 05
 2011 – On The Road Mix (Bpitch Control) – For the German issue of DJMag

Remixes 
 1996 – Gut-Humpe – "Butterpump (Ellen Allien rmx)"
 1996 – Gut-Humpe – "Butter (Ellen Allien dub)"
 2001 – Malaria! – "Eifersucht (Ellen Allien rmx)"
 2001 – Miss Kittin & Goldenboy – "Rippin Kittin (Ellen Allien rmx)"
 2001 – PeterLicht – "Die Transsylvanische Verwandte Ist Da (Ellen Allien Fun Maniac mix)"
 2002 – Covenant – "Bullet (Ellen Allien rmx)"
 2003 – Apparat – "Koax (Ellen Allien rmx)"
 2003 – Barbara Morgenstern – "Aus Heiterem Himmel (Ellen Allien rmx)"
 2003 – OMR – "The Way We Have Chosen (Ellen Allien rmx)"
 2003 – Sascha Funke – "Forms And Shapes (Ellen Allien rmx)"
 2003 – Vicknoise – "Chromosoma 23 (Ellen Allien rmx)"
 2004 – Gold Chains – "Let's Get It On (Ellen Allien rmx)"
 2004 – Miss Yetti – "Marguerite (Ellen Allien rmx)"
 2004 – Neulander – "Sex, God + Money (Ellen Allien rmx)"
 2005 – George Thompson – "Laid Back Snack Attack (Ellen Allien Via mix)"
 2006 – Audion – "Just A Man (Ellen Allien rmx)"
 2007 – Beck – "Cellphone's Dead (Ellen Allien rmx)"
 2007 – Louderbach – "Season 6 (Ellen Allien Away rmx)"
 2007 – Safety Scissors – "Where Is Germany And How Do I Get There (Ellen Allien Germany rmx)"
 2009 – Uffie – "Pop The Glock (Ellen Allien Bang The Glock Mix 2009)"
 2010 – We Love – "Hide Me (Ellen Allien Remix)" (BPitch Control)
 2011 – Moderat – "Seamonkey (Ellen Allien Remix)" (BPitch Control)
 2011 – AUX 88 – "Real To Reel (Ellen Allien Remix)" (Puzzlebox Records)
 2012 – Telefon Tel Aviv – "The Birds (Ellen Allien Remix)" (BPitch Control)
 2014 – Shinedoe – "Panomanic (Ellen Allien Remix)" (Intacto Records)
 2017 – Skinnerbox – "Gender (Ellen Allien Remix)" (Turbo)
 2017 – Depeche Mode - "Cover me (Ellen Allien U.F.O. Remix)" (Mute Records)
 2018 – Mount Kimbie - "T.A.M.E.D. (Ellen Allien U.F.O. Rmx)" (Warp Records)
 2019 – Loco Dice - "We're Alive (Ellen Allien About XX Remix)" (Desolat)
 2019 – Shlømo - "Mercurial Skin (Ellen Allien Remix)" (Taapion Records)
 2020 – Amotik - "Tetalis (Ellen Allien Remix)" (AMOTIK)

References

External links 

 
 Orchestra of Bubbles Webpage
 RBMA Radio On Demand - Live at six d.o.g.s - Ellen Allien (BPitch Control, Berlin)
 

1968 births
BPitch Control artists
Women DJs
German women pop singers
German women singer-songwriters
German singer-songwriters
German record producers
German techno musicians
German women record producers
Intelligent dance musicians
Living people
Singers from Berlin
Synth-pop singers
Women in electronic music
Musical groups from Berlin